The Society for Community Organization (SoCO) is a non-governmental and human rights advocacy group in Hong Kong. The group was founded in 1971 by church members. It is also financially supported by donations from various churches, overseas funding, the Community Chest and individuals. The group has organised community social actions and civic education programmes to encourage political participation by the public.

History
The SoCO emerged from the Yaumatei resettlement movement in 1971–72, when the social workers campaigned for resettling the boat people in the Yaumatei typhoon shelter residents in affordable public housing. The Maryknolls and the staff of the Hong Kong Christian Industrial Committee (HKCIC) came together and founded the SoCO in 1971 to work toward addressing local, grassroots concerns by building communities and community involvement in some of Hong Kong's poorest and most industrial neighbourhoods.

See also 
Human rights in Hong Kong

References

External links
 

Politics of Hong Kong
Charities based in Hong Kong
Social workers' associations in Hong Kong
Social care in Hong Kong